The Corpse Grinders is a 1971 American comedy horror film directed by Ted V. Mikels.

Plot

When the Lotus Cat Food Company finds itself in financial trouble, the owners stumble upon a new, cheap source of meat—the local graveyard. Only one problem—the cats develop a taste for human flesh, and the pets have turned viciously against their owners all over town. Veterinary doctor Howard Glass (Sean Kenney) and his nurse Angie Robinson (Monika Kelly) become suspicious and begin to investigate. "It’s a silly little gore comedy that stars Sanford Mitchell and J. Byron Foster as the owners of a cat food firm who find their sales booming when they accidentally turn a sleeping partner into cat food."

Cast
 Sean Kenney as Dr. Howard Glass
 Monika Kelly as Angie Robinson
 Sanford Mitchell as Landau
 J. Byron Foster as Maltby
 Warren Ball as Caleb
 Ann Noble as Cleo
 Vince Barbi as Monk
 Harry Lovejoy as The Neighbor
 Earl Burnam as Mr. Desisto
 Zena Foster as Mrs. Babcock
 Ray Dannis as Mr. Babcock
 Drucilla Hoy as Tessie
 Charles Fox as Willie (as Charles 'Foxy' Fox)

Production
The film was based on a script by Arch Hall who Mikels called "such a nice, nice man. This was the only time in my life where somebody brought in a full script. It wasn’t called THE CORPSE GRINDERS. I started to read it and I was enthralled and right while Arch was sitting there, I said ‘How much do you want for this?’ And he told me. I said, ‘Let’s go across the street to my bank.’ I liked the whole concept, but of course, it changed a great deal. I bought the property right then and there.”

"The Corpse Grinders is the giddy centerpiece of a four year homemade-horror phase in the life of Mikels. It’s also a defining moment in off-the-cuff, vintage drive-in comfort."

Reception

Mikels said later "it made its own name all over the world. No matter where I go, people talk about CORPSE GRINDERS. Boomers, if you want to call them that, said they saw that when they were kids and have never forgotten it, it’s the most memorable picture they ever saw. It set box office records, when the tickets were 25 and 50 cents, that, even to this day, surpassed even the big pictures today. It made a lot of money. It’s the only picture where I made some money."
 
In its review of the film, Variety wrote that it "carries enough blood to satisfy any cravings for this type of divertissement, but it's a cheapie in every respect." Conversely, Eric Henderson of Slant Magazine stated: "Make no mistake, there is nothing in Ted V. Mikels' infamous grindhouse cheapie The Corpse Grinders even a fraction as disturbing as the graphic art of its promotional one-sheet."

References

External links
 
 
 
 
 

1971 films
1970s comedy horror films
1971 independent films
American comedy horror films
American independent films
Films about cats
1971 comedy films
Films directed by Ted V. Mikels
1970s English-language films
1970s American films